The 1969–70 DFB-Pokal was the 27th season of the annual German football cup competition. It began on 3 January 1970 and ended on 29 August 1970. 32 teams competed in the tournament of five rounds. In the final Kickers Offenbach defeated 1. FC Köln 2–1.

Mode
The tournament consisted of five single elimination rounds. In case a game ended with a draw 30 minutes of extra time were played. If the score was still level the game was replayed with 30 minutes of extra time in case of another draw. If still no winner could be determined the team to advance to the next round was determined by drawing.

As the 1970 FIFA World Cup began on 31 May the German Football Association, scheduled all games except the first round to take place in the summer break after the World Cup. Beginning with the second round the clubs therefore played with the roster for the 1970–71 Bundesliga season.

Matches

First round

Replay

Round of 16

Replays

* Aachen won by drawing as both games were tied.

Quarter-finals

Semi-finals

Final

References

External links
 Official site of the DFB 
 Kicker.de 
 1970 results at Fussballdaten.de 
 1970 results at Weltfussball.de 

1969-70
1969–70 in German football cups